David Swanson (born 1969) is an American anti-war activist, blogger and author. He currently resides in Virginia and is the Executive Director of World Beyond War.

Education
Swanson obtained a Master of Philosophy degree from the University of Virginia in 1997.

Career

As an activist, Swanson co-founded the website After Downing Street (now WarIsACrime.org), based around the U.S. congressional concern of the Downing Street memo. Additionally, Swanson embarked on a campaign to impeach President George W. Bush and Vice President Dick Cheney through the now defunct website ConvictBushCheney.Org as well as contributing to the introduction of Dennis Kucinich’s The 35 Articles of Impeachment and the Case for Prosecuting George W. Bush.
Swanson has also aided in the organization of campaigns such as Velvet Revolution's opposition of the United States Chamber of Commerce and Tom J. Donohue, and October2011.Org's Occupy Washington movement.

As an author, David Swanson has written several books; Daybreak: Undoing the Imperial Presidency and Forming a More Perfect Union (2009), War Is a Lie (2010), When the World Outlawed War (2011) and War No More: The Case for Abolition (2013). Swanson is the host of the radio show Talk Nation Radio.

In 2018 Swanson was awarded the US Peace Prize by the US Peace Memorial Foundation for inspiring antiwar leadership, writings, strategies, and organizations that help to create a culture of peace.

Swanson currently blogs through various political sites, including his own co-founded site, WarIsACrime.Org and Democrats.com, where he serves as the Washington Director. He also writes at his personal website DavidSwanson.Org

Writings
 Kucinich, Dennis J., David C.N. Swanson, and Elizabeth de la Vega. The 35 Articles of Impeachment and the Case for Prosecuting George W. Bush. Port Townsend, Washington, Feral House, 2008. 
  Daybreak: Undoing the Imperial Presidency and Forming a More Perfect Union. New York: Seven Stories Press. 2009. 
 War Is A Lie (2010, 2016). Just World Books.  
 Snippers Saves the World (2021). David Swanson. 
 Leaving World War II Behind (2021). David Swanson. 
 20 Dictators Currently Supported by the U.S. (2020). David Swanson. 
 Curing Exceptionalism (2018). David Swanson. 
 War Is Never Just (2016). David Swanson. 
 Killing Is Not A Way of Life (2014). David Swanson. 
 War No More: The Case For Abolition (2013). David Swanson. 
 Tube World (2012). Illustrated by Shane Burke. David Swanson. 
 The Military Industrial Complex at 50 (2011). Editor and contributor. David Swanson. 
 When The World Outlawed War (2011). David Swanson.

See also
 Anti-war movement
 Peace movement
 List of peace activists
 Civil disobedience
 World Beyond War

References

External links
 www.DavidSwanson.org
 World Beyond War
 RootsAction.org

1969 births
Living people
American male journalists
St. Cloud State University alumni
University of Virginia alumni
20th-century American journalists